H. L. Jensen (December 26, 1928 - December 22, 2020) was an American politician in the state of Wyoming. He served in the Wyoming House of Representatives as a member of the Democratic Party. He attended the University of Utah and was a liquor retailer.

References

1928 births
2020 deaths
Politicians from Salt Lake City
University of Utah alumni
Businesspeople from Wyoming
Democratic Party members of the Wyoming House of Representatives